Histone cluster 2, H3, pseudogene 2, also known as HIST2H3PS2, is a human gene.

References

Further reading

Pseudogenes